Tim Steidten (born 27 April 1979 in Germany) is a German former professional footballer who played as a defensive midfielder.

References

External links
 

Living people
1979 births
German footballers
Association football midfielders
SV Werder Bremen II players
Seattle Sounders (1994–2008) players
FC Oberneuland players
VfB Oldenburg players
SV Meppen players
VfL Oldenburg players
German expatriate footballers
German expatriate sportspeople in the United States
Expatriate soccer players in the United States